Champigny-sur-Marne (literally Champigny on Marne) is a commune in the southeastern suburbs of Paris, France.

Name
Champigny-sur-Marne was originally called simply Champigny. The name Champigny ultimately comes from Medieval Latin Campaniacum, meaning "estate of Campanius", a Gallo-Roman landowner.

In 1897 the name of the commune officially became Champigny-sur-Marne (meaning "Champigny upon Marne"), in order to distinguish it from other communes of France also called Champigny.

Demographics

Immigration

Transport
Champigny-sur-Marne is served by Les Boullereaux – Champigny station on Paris RER line E.

Champigny-sur-Marne is also served by Champigny station on Paris RER line A. This station, although administratively located on the territory of the neighboring commune of Saint-Maur-des-Fossés, lies immediately across the river Marne from the town center of Champigny-sur-Marne and is thus used by people in Champigny.

The Paris Métro is planned to eventually serve the center of Champigny; the new station will be located along RN4, near the railway bridge known as Pont de la Plage.

Education
Primary schools:
 Preschools: Nine for the 9e circonscription and 7 for the 18e circonscription
 Elementary schools: Seven for the 9e circonscription and 6 for the 18e circonscription

Secondary schools:
 Junior high schools: Collège Willy-Ronis and Collège Paul-Vaillant-Couturier
 Senior high schools: Lycée Louise Michel, Lycée Marx-Dormoy, Lycée Langevin-Wallon, Lycée professionnel Gabriel-Péri
In addition Lycée professionnel et technologique Samuel-de-Champlain is in nearby Chennevières-sur-Marne

Notable people 
 Djamel Belmadi (born 27 March 1976) is a retired Algerian footballer and is the current manager of Algeria National Football Team.
 Jeff Reine-Adélaïde (born 17 January 1998) is a professional footballer, currently plays as a midfielder for Nice, on loan from Lyon.
 Mickael Alphonse, footballer
 Yan Valery (born 22 February 1999) is a French-Tunisian professional footballer, currently plays as a right-back for Birmingham City, on loan from Southampton.
 Adrien Regattin, (born 22 August 1991) is a Moroccan professional footballer, currently plays as a midfielder for Altay.
 Samuel Benchetrit (born 26 June 1973) is a French writer, actor, scenarist and director[1]. He is of Moroccan-Jewish descent.
 Nicolas Senzemba (born 25 March 1996) is a French footballer playing for CS Sedan Ardennes.

International relations

Champigny-sur-Marne is twinned with:

 Alpiarça, Portugal
 Bernau bei Berlin, Germany
 Jalapa, Nicaragua
 Musselburgh, Scotland, United Kingdom
 Rosignano Marittimo, Italy

See also
Communes of the Val-de-Marne department

References

External links

Champigny-sur-Marne official website 
Champigny Blog 
Historic D.B.racing cars of Champigny/Marne 

Communes of Val-de-Marne